Light in the High Plains is a 1953 Venezuelan film directed by Víctor Urruchúa. It was entered into the 1953 Cannes Film Festival.

Cast
 José Elías Moreno as Jose
 Carmen Montejo as Angela
 Hilda Vera as Julia
 Luis Salazar as Pedro Maria
 Ildemaro García
 Esteban Herrera as Arcadio
 Jorge Reyes as Zamarro
 Elvira Morla as Pastora
 David Peraza
 Gran Marcos

References

Bibliography 
 Darlene J. Sadlier. Latin American Melodrama: Passion, Pathos, and Entertainment. University of Illinois Press, 2009.

External links

1953 films
Venezuelan drama films
1950s Spanish-language films
Venezuelan black-and-white films
Films directed by Víctor Urruchúa